Jill Norgaard is an American politician and a former Republican member of the Arizona House of Representatives representing District 18 from 2015 to 2019. She previously worked as Vice President of McKechnie Plastics in Minnesota.

Education
Norgaard earned her BS and MBA from The University of North Dakota.

Elections
 2018 – Norgaard was defeated in the general election by Democratic opponent Jennifer Jermaine.
 2016 – Norgaard and Robson were unopposed in the Republican primary. Norgaard and Democratic challenger Mitzi Epstein defeated Robson and Green candidate Linda Macias on November 8. Norgaard was the second vote getter in the election with 50,613 votes.
 2014 – Norgaard successfully ran alongside Bob Robson. Norgaard came in first ahead of Robson and Democratic challenger Denise "Mitzi" Epstein in the general election with 32,863 votes.

References

External links
 Official page at the Arizona State Legislature
 Biography at Ballotpedia

Place of birth missing (living people)
Year of birth missing (living people)
Living people
Republican Party members of the Arizona House of Representatives
Politicians from Phoenix, Arizona
21st-century American politicians
Women state legislators in Arizona
21st-century American women politicians